Kevin Serge Durand (born January 14, 1974) is a Canadian actor. He is best known for portraying Vasiliy Fet in The Strain, Joshua in Dark Angel, Martin Keamy in Lost, Fred J. Dukes / The Blob in X-Men Origins: Wolverine, Barry Burton in Resident Evil: Retribution, Gabriel in Legion, Little John in Robin Hood, Jeeves Tremor in Smokin' Aces, and Carlos in The Butterfly Effect. He received a 2012 Best Supporting Actor Genie nomination for his portrayal of Lenny Jackson in Citizen Gangster.

Early life
Kevin Serge Durand was born January 14, 1974, in Thunder Bay, Ontario, the son of Reina (née Perreault) and Serge Durand. He is of French-Canadian descent.

Career
Durand's first break came when he was cast in Mystery, Alaska.  He often portrays characters on both sides of law enforcement, such as Booth in Walking Tall, sidekick Red in Wild Hogs, the psychotic neo-nazi Jeeves Tremor in Smokin' Aces, the title role in Otis E., Gabriel in Legion, Little John in Robin Hood, and the hired thug Tucker in the 2007 remake of 3:10 to Yuma.

Durand appeared opposite Hugh Jackman in X-Men Origins: Wolverine as Blob and in Real Steel. In 2012, he co-starred in Citizen Gangster and David Cronenberg's Cosmopolis, and as video game character Barry Burton in the fifth installment of the Resident Evil movie franchise, Resident Evil: Retribution. In 2013, he appeared in the film The Mortal Instruments. He co-starred in Darren Aronofsky's Noah and two mid-2010s Atom Egoyan films, Devil's Knot and The Captive.

Durand has played series regulars on shows such as Joshua in Dark Angel, Vasiliy Fet in The Strain, Harbard the Wanderer in Vikings, Agent Jay Swopes in the American remake of Touching Evil, as well as guest roles on CSI, CSI: Miami, ER, Without a Trace, Dead Like Me and others. He also recurred on the television show Stargate SG-1 as Lord Zipacna and on Lost as Martin Keamy.

Personal life
Durand married his longtime girlfriend Sandra Cho on October 1, 2010. They have two daughters.

Filmography

Film

Television

References

External links

Canadian male film actors
Canadian male television actors
Canadian male voice actors
Canadian people of French descent
Living people
People from Thunder Bay
20th-century Canadian male actors
21st-century Canadian male actors
Male actors from Ontario
1974 births